Morrill may refer to:

Locations in the United States
 Morrill, Kansas
 Morrill Township, Brown County, Kansas
 Morrill, Maine
 Morrill Township, Morrison County, Minnesota
 Morrill, Nebraska
 Morrill County, Nebraska
 Morrill, Texas

People
 Annie Morrill Smith, botanist and genealogist
 Amos Morrill, a U.S. Federal Court Judge
 Anson P. Morrill, Governor of Maine and U.S. Congressman
 Charles Henry Morrill, businessman prominent in the history of Nebraska
 David L. Morril (note spelling), Governor of New Hampshire and U.S. Senator
 Edmund Needham Morrill, Governor of Kansas and U.S. Congressman
 James Morrill, former president of the Univ. of Minnesota
 John Morrill (baseball), baseball player for the Boston Beaneaters
 John Morrill (historian)
 Justin Smith Morrill, U.S. Senator from Vermont, whose namesake legislation includes:
 Morrill Land-Grant Colleges Act
 Morrill Tariff
 Morrill Anti-Bigamy Act
 Lot M. Morrill, Governor of Maine, U.S. Senator, and Secretary of the U.S. Treasury under President Grant
 Mary Morrill, early Nantucket settler and grandmother of Benjamin Franklin
 Rowena Morrill, artist and illustrator
 Samuel P. Morrill, U.S. Congressman from Maine
 Sam Morril, comedian 
 Stew Morrill, head coach of the Utah State University men's basketball team
 Walter Goodale Morrill, recipient of the Medal of Honor

See also
 Merrill (disambiguation)
 Morrell, a surname